Edenton Historic District is a national historic district located at Edenton, Chowan County, North Carolina. The district encompasses 342 contributing buildings, 4 contributing sites, and 3 contributing structures. It includes several buildings that are individually listed on the National Register.  The Lane House (ca. 1718), possibly the oldest surviving house in North Carolina, is owned by Steve and Linda Lane and is located within the district.  Also located in the district are the Dixon-Powell House, William Leary House, and Louis Ziegler House designed by architect George Franklin Barber.

It was listed on the National Register of Historic Places in 1973, with boundary increases in 2001 and 2007.

References

Historic districts on the National Register of Historic Places in North Carolina
Greek Revival architecture in North Carolina
Romanesque Revival architecture in North Carolina
Colonial Revival architecture in North Carolina
Buildings and structures in Chowan County, North Carolina
National Register of Historic Places in Chowan County, North Carolina